The "sweater curse" or "curse of the love sweater" is a term used by knitters to describe the belief that if a knitter gives a hand-knit sweater to a significant other, it will lead to the recipient breaking up with the knitter. In an alternative formulation, the relationship will end before the sweater is even completed. The belief is widely discussed in knitting publications, and some knitters claim to have experienced it. In a 2005 poll, 15% of active knitters said that they had experienced the sweater curse firsthand, and 41% considered it a possibility that should be taken seriously.

Despite its name, the "sweater curse" is treated in knitting literature not as a superstition governed by paranormal forces, but rather as a real-world pitfall of knitting that has rational explanations.  Several plausible mechanisms for the sweater curse have been proposed, but it has not been studied systematically.

Existence

The existence of the phenomenon is anecdotal, and may be related to confirmation bias; knitters may remember breakups more clearly after giving a hand-knit sweater, which represents a significant investment of money (typically over $100), effort (~100,000 stitches), time (as much as a year) and romantic imagination.

Proposed mechanisms

Although the existence of this effect remains uncertain, it is a common belief amongst the knitting population, and several plausible (and non-exclusive) mechanisms for the sweater curse have been suggested within knitting periodicals and books:

 Unlucky timing.  Knitting a sweater takes a long time, and the relationship dies of natural causes during its making.  
 Catalyst for analyzing the relationship.  Giving or receiving a significant gift such as a sweater may cause either the giver or receiver to evaluate the relationship. For example, the gift may seem too intimate, too domestic or too binding to the significant other. It can be seen as a signal that makes them realize that the relationship is not reciprocal, prompting them to end the relationship before it involves obligations.
 Aversion.  The significant other may simply not want to wear anything hand-knit.  A hand-knit sweater can also subject them to ridicule, either because the sweater looks bad (i.e., poorly made or unfashionable) or conveys overly domestic connotations.
 Misdirected attention. The knitter loves their sweater a little too much, and pesters the significant other about the sweater. Alternatively, the knitter loves to knit too much, and spends too much time with their knitting instead of with the significant other.

Avoiding the curse
For many knitters, making a hand-knit gift is an emotional experience, an extended affectionate meditation on the person receiving the gift.  A metaphor commonly used by knitters is, "I knit my love into every stitch." Since giving too significant a gift too early in a relationship can evoke apprehension, knitters have been advised to match the knitted gift to the stage in the relationship, beginning with hats, mittens, scarves, or socks before graduating to sweaters.  Many knitters also wait until marriage before making a sweater for a significant other.

Common-sense advice to knitters is that they should determine whether the recipient would ever wear a hand-knitted sweater.  Knitters have also been advised to involve the significant other in designing the sweater (e.g. in choosing its design, colors and materials) and follow their suggestions, even if the knitter objects.  Several books offer practical design advice for avoiding the sweater curse.

See also

 Curse
 Curse of the ninth
 Knitting
 Knitting clubs
 Macbeth curse
 Urban legend

References

Curses
Knitting
Luck